Autophila is a genus of moths in the family Erebidae.

Species

 Autophila afghana Ronkay, 1986
 Autophila anaphanes Boursin, 1940
 Autophila asiatica (Staudinger, 1888)
 Autophila banghaasi Boursin, 1940
 Autophila berioi Bytinski-Salz, 1937
 Autophila cataphanes (Hübner, [1813])
 Autophila cerealis (Staudinger, 1871)
 Autophila chamaephanes Boursin, 1940
 Autophila cinnamonea Ronkay, 1989
 Autophila cryptica Ronkay, 1986
 Autophila cymaenotaenia Boursin, 1940
 Autophila deleta Benedek & Ronkay, 2001
 Autophila depressa (Püngeler, 1914)
 Autophila dilucida (Hübner, [1808])
 Autophila einsleri Amsel, 1935
 Autophila eremocharis Boursin, 1940
 Autophila eremochroa Boursin, 1940
 Autophila eurytaenia Boursin, 1963
 Autophila fuscolampra Hacker & Ronkay, 1990
 Autophila glebicolor (Ershov, 1874)
 Autophila gracilis (Staudinger, 1874)
 Autophila himalayica (Hampson, 1894)
 Autophila hirsuta (Staudinger, 1870)
 Autophila hirsutula (Alphéraky, 1893)
 Autophila horrida Boursin, 1955
 Autophila inconspicua (Butler, 1881)
 Autophila iranica Ronkay, 1989
 Autophila laetifica (Staudinger, 1888)
 Autophila lia (Püngeler, 1906)
 Autophila libanotica (Staudinger, 1901)
 Autophila ligaminosa (Eversmann, 1851)
 Autophila limbata (Staudinger, 1871)
 Autophila maculifera (Staudinger, 1888)
 Autophila magnifica Boursin, 1963
 Autophila maura (Staudinger, 1888)
 Autophila monstruosa Boursin, 1967
 Autophila myriospea Boursin, 1940
 Autophila osthelderi Boursin, 1940
 Autophila pauli Boursin, 1940
 Autophila plattneri Boursin, 1955
 Autophila rasilis (Püngeler, 1906)
 Autophila rosea (Staudinger, 1888)
 Autophila simplex (Staudinger, 1888)
 Autophila simulata Ronkay, 1986
 Autophila sinesafida Wiltshire, 1952
 Autophila subfusca (Christoph, 1893)
 Autophila tancrei Boursin, 1940
 Autophila tetrastigma Boursin, 1940
 Autophila umbrifera (Kollar, 1848)
 Autophila vartianae Ronkay, 1986
 Autophila vespertalis (Staudinger, 1896)
 Autophila xena Ronkay, 1986
 Autophila xenomima Ronkay, 1989

References
 Autophila at Markku Savela's Lepidoptera and Some Other Life Forms
 Natural History Museum Lepidoptera genus database

Toxocampinae
Moth genera